The giant Asian pond turtle (Heosemys grandis) inhabits rivers, streams, marshes, and rice paddies from estuarine lowlands to moderate altitudes (up to about ) throughout Cambodia and Vietnam and in parts of Laos, Malaysia, Myanmar and Thailand.

Description
Slight variations in coloration can be seen among the species. The carapace of the giant Asian pond turtle has a brown to black coloration with a distinct ridge along the center while the plastron is yellow in color. The head is gray to brown in color.

Habitat and behavior
Capable of living in water or on land the giant Asian pond turtle can be located along bodies of water such as lakes, ponds, rivers, streams, and canals. The giant Asian pond turtle is omnivorous and finds food in both aquatic and terrestrial environments. Their diets consist of worms, larvae, insects, snails, deceased animals, and aquatic and terrestrial plants. Similarly to other species of turtles, the giant Asian pond turtle has developed adaptations and different techniques for capturing prey in both types of environments.

Major threats
The main area of concern is the illegal capture and export of these turtles for use as food and (less commonly) as pets in parts of Asia. Additionally, their habitat is threatened by land conversion for agriculture.

Gallery

References

External links
 Heosemys grandis Species Description (on Heosemys.org)
 Asian Turtle Conservation Network Page
 Asian Turtle Consortium Page
 London Zoo Page

Heosemys
Turtles of Asia
Reptiles of Southeast Asia
Reptiles described in 1860